St. Stephen's Church, Bunker's Hill, also known as Trinity Free Church, was a Church of England church in Nottingham between 1859 and 1896.

History

It was built as Trinity Free Church, a chapel of ease to Holy Trinity Church, Trinity Square and opened in 1859. By 1868 the church sought independence from Holy Trinity, and the church was enlarged by Thomas Chambers Hine. The Rt. Revd. John Jackson the Bishop of Lincoln consecrated the new church on 26 November 1868 as St. Stephen's, Bunker's Hill.

A detailed history of the church can be found on the Southwell and Nottingham DAC Church History Website.

Organ

The organ was moved to St. Stephen's Church in Hyson Green. A specification of the organ can be found on the National Pipe Organ Register.

Organists
E.T. Evans 1889 - ????

Closure

The church was demolished in 1896 by the Manchester, Sheffield and Lincolnshire Railway (later the Great Central Railway) to make way for Nottingham Victoria railway station. The railway company paid £10,000 (equivalent to £ as of )  for the church and land and the money went towards the building of a new church of St. Stephen's Church, Hyson Green. Many of the church fittings also went to the new church.

The location of the church is now covered by the Victoria Centre, which replaced Nottingham Victoria railway station.

References

Buildings and structures demolished in 1896
Former Church of England church buildings
Demolished buildings and structures in Nottingham
Nottingham St. Stephen
Nottingham St. Stephen